The 46th César Awards ceremony, presented by the Académie des Arts et Techniques du Cinéma, took place on 12 March 2021 to honour the best French films of 2020. Roschdy Zem  presided, and Marina Foïs hosted the show for the first time.

Winners and nominees
The nominees for the 46th César Awards were announced on 10 February 2021.

Films with multiple nominations
The following films received multiple nominations:

Performers

See also
 33rd European Film Awards

References

External links
 Official website

2021
2020 film awards
2021 in French cinema
2021 in Paris
March 2021 events in France